Staveleya is a genus of European sheet weavers. Its current name is a replacement for Hypsocephalus, already a genus in the snapper family of fish. The type species was originally described under the name "Microneta pusilla", but the type species is designated one of the junior synonyms, "Cnephalocotes dahli" because it has a physical specimen. The genus is named in honour of Eliza Fanny Staveley, the first woman to publish research on arachnology in the United Kingdom.

Species
 it contains four species:
S. huberti (Millidge, 1975) – France (Corsica)
S. nesiotes (Simon, 1915) – France (Corsica)
S. paulae (Simon, 1918) – France, Switzerland, Italy
S. pusilla (Menge, 1869) (type) – Central Europe and Italy to Greece and Ukraine

See also
 Mecopisthes
 Cnephalocotes
 Microneta
 List of Linyphiidae species (Q–Z)

References

Further reading

Linyphiidae genera
Spiders of Europe